= Bowling at the 2010 South American Games – Men's all events teams =

The Men's all events team event at the 2010 South American Games was the sum of the four previous competitions.

== Medalists ==
Gold	Silver	Bronze
Manuel Otalora; Andrés Gómez; Jaime González; David Romero; Colombia	Danny Fung Sun; Rafael Eduardo Medina; Luis Richard Olivo; Ildemaro Ricardo Ruiz; Venezuela	Juliano Oliveira; Charles Robini; Marcio Vieira; Walter Costa; Brazil

== Results ==
Rank	Team	Athlete	Event				Total	Grand
Rank	Team	Athlete	Singles	Doubles	Trios/ Mixed	Teams	Total	Grand
1st place, gold medalist(s)	Colombia	Manuel Otalora (COL)	1374	1129	1337	1170	5010	19,803
1st place, gold medalist(s)	Colombia	Jaime González (COL)	1319	1139	1232	1273	4963	19,803
1st place, gold medalist(s)	Colombia	Andrés Gómez (COL)	1361	1167	1256	1135	4919	19,803
1st place, gold medalist(s)	Colombia	David Romero (COL)	1300	1147	1292	1172	4911	19,803
2nd place, silver medalist(s)	Venezuela	Rafael Eduardo Medina (VEN)	1291	1041	1365	1225	4922	19,114
2nd place, silver medalist(s)	Venezuela	Ildemaro Ricardo Ruiz (VEN)	1345	1194	1133	1172	4844	19,114
2nd place, silver medalist(s)	Venezuela	Luis Richard Olivo (VEN)	1196	1175	1257	1099	4727	19,114
2nd place, silver medalist(s)	Venezuela	Danny Fung Sun (VEN)	1161	1100	1214	1146	4621	19,114
3rd place, bronze medalist(s)	Brazil	Juliano Oliveira (BRA)	1214	1175	1295	1138	4822	18,242
3rd place, bronze medalist(s)	Brazil	Charles Robini (BRA)	1269	1114	1151	995	4529	18,242
3rd place, bronze medalist(s)	Brazil	Marcio Vieira (BRA)	1159	1165	1124	1076	4524	18,242
3rd place, bronze medalist(s)	Brazil	Walter Costa (BRA)	1242	1034	1125	966	4367	18,242
4	Argentina	Jonatha Ariel Hocsman (ARG)	1305	1040	1372	1020	4737	18,066
4	Argentina	Ricardo Javier Rosa (ARG)	1268	1033	1163	1066	4530	18,066
4	Argentina	Sebastian Montalbetti (ARG)	1232	877	1303	1091	4503	18,066
4	Argentina	Christian Fernando Dalmasso (ARG)	1192	819	1257	1028	4296	18,066
5	Chile	Luis Felipe Gonzalez (CHI)	1194	1048	1262	1068	4572	17,854
5	Chile	Adrian Reyes Vargas (CHI)	1234	1035	1217	1043	4529	17,854
5	Chile	Harold Andrés Pickering (CHI)	1264	1004	1141	1026	4435	17,854
5	Chile	Pablo Alejandro Pohl (CHI)	1097	991	1264	966	4318	17,854
6	Bolivia	Ignacio Rojas Patino (BOL)	1313	909	1223	1009	4454	17,452
6	Bolivia	Sebastian Nemtala Garcia (BOL)	1325	1026	1141	926	4418	17,452
6	Bolivia	Pablo Hinojosa Rojas (BOL)	1161	962	1173	1050	4346	17,452
6	Bolivia	Oscar Guillermo Candia (BOL)	1046	1035	1120	1033	4234	17,452
7	Netherlands Antilles	Emiel Samander (AHO)	1339	985	1143	1069	4536	17,113
7	Netherlands Antilles	Carlos Finx (AHO)	1184	1136	1150	1026	4496	17,113
7	Netherlands Antilles	Tarik Samander (AHO)	1097	1020	1096	859	4072	17,113
7	Netherlands Antilles	Felix Ibañez (AHO)	1036	1005	975	993	4009	17,113
8	Peru	Adolfo Edgardo Chang (PER)	1095	1146	1191	1064	4496	17,108
8	Peru	Eduardo Fujinaka (PER)	1140	1115	1161	945	4361	17,108
8	Peru	Victor Ricardo Takechi (PER)	1018	1069	1068	1039	4194	17,108
8	Peru	Denis Richard Toyoda (PER)	1212	918	1071	856	4057	17,108
9	Aruba	Jason Odor (ARU)	1085	1119	1148	1049	4401	17,015
9	Aruba	Laurence Wilming (ARU)	1198	963	1123	977	4261	17,015
9	Aruba	Errol Brown (ARU)	1018	1022	1127	1054	4221	17,015
9	Aruba	Nelson Kelly (ARU)	1069	1011	1029	1023	4123	17,015
10	Paraguay	Alejandro Kelly Carricarte (PAR)	1229	963	1304	1043	4539	16,419
10	Paraguay	Jorge Luis Alarcon (PAR)	1195	961	1128	885	4169	16,419
10	Paraguay	Alejandro Ignacio Lopez (PAR)	1065	874	1031	894	3864	16,419
10	Paraguay	Chieh Hsiao Tzu (PAR)	1056	827	1106	858	3847	16,419
